This is a list of television programs currently broadcast by the cable television channel Fox in Turkey.

Currently broadcast 
Medyapim

Dramas 
2018-: Yasak Elma (By Medyapim)
 2021-: Aşk Mantık İntikam (By No Douvz Productions)
 2021-: Kanunsuz Topraklar (By Gold Yapim)
2021-: Mahkum (14 Aralık Salı ve 16 Aralık Perşembe) (By MF Yapim)
2021-: Ayrililk (24 Aralık Perşembe) (By MF Yapim)
2021-: Skandal (26 Aralık Cumartesi) (By Limon Yapim)
2022-: Son Nefesime Kadar (Yakında) (By Mia Yapim)
2022-: Yaniliş Álcool (Harızan 2022 Yakında) (By MF Yapim)

2022-: PimentaPinky (Eylül 2022 Yakında) (By Gold Yapim)
2022-: MangKate (Eylül 2022 Yakında) (By Filmevi Yapim)
2022-: Terry Yorkdızı (Ekim 2022 Yakında) (By Medyapim)
2022-: Paı Zacarıas (Ekim 2022 Yakında) (By Filmevi Yapim)
2022-: Zacarıas Mundo (Kasım 2022 Yakında) (By NitoBytes)
2022-: Xadrez Chess (Aralık 2022 Yakında) (By Nyc Medya)
2023-: Smartphone Celular (Ocak 2023 Yakında) (By MF Yapim)

News and information 
2009-: Burak Birsen ile FOX Ana Haber Hafta Sonu 
2010-: Gülbin Tosun ile FOX Ana Haber Hafta Sonu  
2013-: İsmail Küçükkaya ile Çalar Saat 
2020-: Selçuk Tepeli ile FOX Ana Haber
2015-: Ezgi Gözeger ile Çalar Saat (during summer)
2017-: İlker Karagöz ile Çalar Saat Hafta Sonu
2021-: Fulya İle Umudun Olsun

Contest
2021-: En Hamarat Benim (13.00   On weekdays)

Life style
2021-: Fulya ile Umudun Olsun
2016-: Memet Özer ile Mutfakta 
2016-: Benden Söylemesi

Formerly broadcast (some)

Dramas 
2007-2008: Yemin (2007-2008)
2007-2010: Bez Bebek 
2007: Belalı Baldız (2005-2006, atv)
2007: Çocuklar Duymasın (2002, TGRT)
2007: Dadı (2000-2001, Show TV and Star TV)
2007: Kod Adı Sonsuzluk
2007: Sırça Saray
2007: Aşk Eski Bir Yalan
2007: Elif'in Günlüğü
2007: Düş Yakamdan
2007: Hırçın Kız
2007: Senin Uğruna
2007: Suç Dosyası
2007: Tutsak
2007: Üç Tatlı Cadı
2007-2008: OKS Anneleri
2007-2008: Yemin
2007-2010: Bez Bebek
2007-2011: Arka Sıradakiler (TNT, 2012)
2008: Ateş ve Barut
2008: Ateşten Koltuk
2008: Dedektif Biraderler
2008: Ece (Kanal 1)
2008: Kabuslar Evi
2008: Memur Muzaffer
2008: Prenses Perfinya
2008: Proje 13
2008: Üvey Aile
2008-2009: Yalancı Romantik (Kanal 1, 2007-2008)
2008-2016: Unutma Beni
2009: Sıkı Dostlar
2009: Uygun Adım Aşk
2009: Yeni Baştan
2009-2010: Çakıl Taşları
2009-2011: Ömre Bedel
2009-2014: Deniz Yıldızı (Star TV)
2010: Sensiz Yaşayamam
2010: Şen Yuva (atv, 2010)
2010-2011: Kirli Beyaz
2010-2011: Öğretmen Kemal
2010-2013: Yer Gök Aşk
2010-2014: Lale Devri (Show TV, 2010)
2011: Arka Sıradakiler Umut
2011: Canan
2011: Derin Sular
2011: Karımın Dediği Dedik Çaldığı Kontrbas
2011: Zehirli Sarmaşık
2011-2012: Babam İçin
2011-2012: Dinle Sevgili
2011-2012: Melekler Korusun (2009-2010, Show TV)
2012: Araf Zamanı
2012: Bir Ferhat ile Şirin Hikayesi - Esir Şehrin Gözyaşları
2012-2013: Aşkın Halleri
2012-2013: Dedemin Dolabı
2012-2013: Harem
2012-2013: Hindistan'da Aşk
2012-2013: Merhaba Hayat
2012-2013: Canım Benim 
2013: Ali Ayşe'yi Seviyor
2013: Babam Sınıfta Kaldı
2013: Fatih Harbiye (Show TV)
2013: Görüş Günü Kadınları
2013: Kahireli Palas
2013: Fatih-Harbiye (Show TV, 2013-)
2013-2014: Bir Aşk Hikayesi
2013-2014: Doktorlar (2006–2011, Show TV)
2013-2014: Çocuklar Duymasın (atv)
2013-2014: Sana Bir Sır Vereceğim
2015-2014: Umutsuz Ev Kadınları (Kanal D, 2011-2012)
2013-2016: Karagül
2014: Asayiş Berkkemal
2014: Benim Hala Umudum Var Star TV, 2013)
2014: Düşler ve Umutlar
2014: Emanet
2014: Günahkar
2014: Kadim Dostum
2014: Not Defteri
2014: Ruhumun Aynası
2014-2015: 1 Erkek 1 Kadın 2 Çocuk'
2014-2015: Kiraz Mevsimi
2014-2016: Kocamın Ailesi
2014-2017: O Hayat Benim
2015: Adı Mutluluk
2015: Sen Benimsin
2015: Şehrin Melekleri
2015: Zengin Kız Fakir Oğlan (TRT 1)
2015-2016: Aşk Yeniden
2015-2016: İnadına Aşk
 2016: Aşk Yalanı Sever
 2016: Çifte Saadet
 2016: Kalbim Yangın Yeri
 2016: N'olur Ayrılalım
 2016: Hayat Sevince Güzel
 2016: Rüzgarın Kalbi
 2016: Kördüğüm
 2016: Familya
 2016-2017: Bana Sevmeyi Anlat
 2016-2017: Muhteşem Yüzyıl: Kösem (transferred from Star TV)
 2016-2017: No 309
 2016-2017: Umuda Kelepçe Vurulmaz
 2016-2018: Kalbimdeki Deniz
 2017: Bu Sayılmaz
 2017: Çoban Yıldızı
 2017: Dayan Yüreğim
 2017: Deli Gönül
 2017: Esaretim Sensin
 2017: Kayıtdışı
 2017: Kırlangıç Fırtınası
 2017: Komşular
 2017: Nerdesin Birader
 2017-2018: Şevkat Yerimdar
 2017-2019: Bizim Hikaye
 2017-2020: Kadın
 2018: Bir Mucize Olsun
 2018: Adı: Zehra
 2018: 4N1K İlk Aşk
 2018: Bir Deli Rüzgar
 2019: Vurgun
 2019: Bir Aile Hikayesi
 2019: Her Yerde Sen
 2019: Kurşun
 2019: Ferhat ile Şirin
2020: Öğretmen

2020: Zümrüdüanka
2020: Şehin
2020-2021: Kerfaret
2020-2021: Bay Yaniliş
2021: Uzak Şerhin Masalı
2021: Son Yaz
2021: Yalancılar ve Mumları
2021: Elbet Bir Gün
2021: Evlilik Hakkinda Her Şey
2021: Misafır
2021: Elkizi

Music-entertainment 

2007: Şebnem'le Fatih (Şebnem Kısaparmak ve Fatih Kısaparmak) (Kanal 7')
2014: Ali Biçim Show (Ali Biçim)
2014: Ferhat Göçer ile Sen Söyle Hayat (Ferhat Göçer)
2014: Nilgün Belgün ile Bir Yaz Gecesi (Nilgün Belgün)
2016: Görevimiz Komedi

Children
Luniler
2007-2008: Çocuktan Al Haberi (Kanal D,Star TV)
2011: Barbie-Polly Pocket-Monster High

Magazine

N'ayır N'olamaz (Pelin Suade)
Reklam Masası
Sobe
2007-2011: Bizden Kaçmaz (Meral Kaplan)
2009-2012: Süper Kulüp (Pelin Suade)
2012-2014: FOX İzliyoruz
2013: Magazin 90 (Ece Begüm Yücetan)
2015: Magazin Postası (Sezgi Sena Akay)

Newsfeed

2007: FOX Flaş
2007: FOX Güncel
2007-2009: FOX Gündem
2007: Güne Bakış
2007: Gün Başladı
2007-2010: İrfan Değirmenci ile Çalar Saat (İrfan Değirmenci) (Kanal D')
2007-2008: Özge Uzun'la Haftasonu Haberleri (Özge Uzun)
2007-2008: Umut Yertutan'la Yaz Haberleri (Umut Yertutan)
2007-2013: Nazlı Tolga ile FOX Ana Haber (Nazlı Tolga)
2008-2009: Özge Uzun'la FOX Beşbucuk (Özge Uzun)
2008-2010: Nazlı Tolga ile FOX ON Ana Haber (Nazlı Tolga) (Fox Ana Haber olarak geldi ve oraya geri döndü)
2009: İrfan Değirmenci'yle Haftasonu Haberleri (İrfan Değirmenci)
2009-2010: Burak Birsen ile FOX Akşam (Burak Birsen)
2009-2010: Alper Altun'la Yaz Haberleri (Alper Altun)
2009-2011: Hilal Ergenekon ile Çalar Saat Hafta Sonu (Hilal Ergenekon)
2010-2013: Fatih Portakal ile Çalar Saat (Fatih Portakal)
2012-2013: FOX Gece (Ezgi Gözeger)
2013-2020: Fatih Portakal ile FOX Ana Haber (Fatih Portakal)

Sports
2007-2010: FOX Sports ( Hilal Ergenekon )
2007-2008: Tribune Fire(Tribün Ateşi)
2007-2008: 4-4-2 ( Bülent Ülgen )
2007-2008: Boxing Night ( Boks Gecesi)
2007-2008: Verkaç
2009: The Turkish Super Cup ( Show TV ) arrives.
2009-2010: FOX Football
2009-2010: FOX Football Market
2009-2010: FOX Goal Market
2009-2011: WWE SmackDown (came from S'nek, went to Smart Sports )
2009-2011: WWE Raw (came from S'nek, went to Smart Sports ),

Women's 
 2016: İşin Sırrı Derya'da (Derya Baykal)

Current affairs

2007: Çapraz Ateş (Reha Muhtar, Mehmet Ali Ilıcak ve Nazlı Ilıcak) (Show TV'den geldi.)
2007-2009: Objektif (Kadir Çelik) (Star TV'den geldi, Beyaz TV'ye geçti.)
2009: Türkiye'nin Seçimi
2011: Hayat Tadında Güzel
2011: Hayatın Şifreleri (Ömer Çelakıl) (TNT'ye geçip geri geldi.)
2012-2013: Hayatın Şiferleri (Ömer Çelakıl) (TNT'den geldi.)
013-2014: Fatih Portakal'la Türkiye'nin Trendleri (Fatih Portakal)
2014: Fatih Portakal'la Seçim 2014 (Fatih Portakal)

Life style

Eve Giden Yol
Uyanık Bar
2007: Asena ile Canımın İçi (Asena)
2007: Pınar Altuğ'la Sizi Böyle Alalım (Pınar Altuğ)
2007: Şebnem Kısaparmak ile Paylaştıkça (Şebnem Kısaparmak) (Kanal 7'den geldi, Flash TV'ye geçti.)
2007-2013: Su Gibi (Songül Karlı ve Uğur Arslan)
2008: İki Gönül Bir Olunca
2009-2010: Dekodizayn (Vahe Kılıçarslan) (Star TV'den geldi, Beyaz TV'ye geçti.)
2010: Kürşat Başar'la (Kürşat Başar) (CNN Türk'ten geldi.)
2010: Rengarenk (Ece Erken)
2011: Taşlama (Demet Tuncer ve Alper Selin)
2011: Van İçin Tek Yürek
2011-2012: Bilsen Neler Oluyor (Murat Güloğlu)
2012-2013: Güneri Civaoğlu ile Şeffaf Oda (Güneri Civaoğlu) (Kanal D'den geldi, tv8'e geçti.)
2013: Affetsen
2013: Bırakın Konuşalım (Nagehan Alçı) (Kanal D'den geldi.)
 2013: Mucize Hayatlar (Uğur Arslan ve Dr. Sevil Öz)
2013: Serap ile Yeni Bir Umut (Serap Paköz)
2014: Nilgün-Gabriele Mutfakta (Nilgün Belgün ve Gabriele Sponza)
2014: Nilgün Belgün ile Yeni Bir Gün (Nilgün Belgün)
2014: Türkan Şoray ile Pazar Kahvaltısı (Türkan Şoray)
 2014-2015: Esra Erol'la (Esra Erol) (passed to atv')
 2015-2016: Zuhal Topal'la (Zuhal Topal) (passed to Star TV)
2016: Benden Söylemesi (Merve Yıldırım)

Contest

Her Şey Aşk İçin (Süheyl ve Behzat Uygur)
2007-2008: Ahmet Çakar'la Şansa Bak (Ahmet Çakar)
2007: Bir Dilek Tut (Star TV'ye geçti.)
2007: Güldür Bakalım (Özgü Namal) (Show TV'den geldi.)
2007-2009: Fort Boyard (Önce Evrim Akın, sonra Janset)
2008-2009: 50 Sarışın (Mehmet Ali Erbil)
2008-2009: Çarkıfelek (Mehmet Ali Erbil) (Kanal 1'den geldi, Star TV'ye geçti.)
2008-2009: Tadında Aşk Var
2009: Popstar Alaturka (Star TV'den geldi.)
2009-2013: Ninja Warrior
2010: Ece Erken'le Benimle Eğlenir misin? (Ece Erken)
2010: Intercities Şehirler Yarışıyor (Çağla Şikel)
2011: 101 (Bay J)
2011: Bambaşka Style By Jury (Tuğçe Kurt)
2011: Cem Kılıç ile Sen de Söyle (Cem Kılıç)
2011: L'Oreal Paris Miss Turkey
2011: Tabu (Alişan ve Çağla Şikel Altuğ) (Her Şey Dahil olarak Show TV'den geldi ve oraya geri döndü.)
2011-2012: Var Mısın Yok Musun (Asuman Krause) (Show TV'den geldi ve oraya geri döndü.)
2012: Bir Milyon Canlı Para (Murat Başoğlu) (Show TV'den geldi, Kanal D'ye geçti.)
2012: Fear Factor Extreme (Asuman Krause) (Orijinal yayın: 2009, Star TV)
2012: Kamuflaj (Show TV'ye geçti.)
2012: Kime Niyet Kime Kısmet (Celal Kadri Kınoğlu)
2012-2013: İmkansız Karaoke Yılbaşı Özel (İrfan Kangı)
2012-2013: Yemekteyiz (Show TV'den geldi.) (Kanal D 'Ye geçti.)
2013: Biri Bizi Durdursun (Ertem Şener)
2013: Fear Factor Aksiyon (Asuman Krause)
2014: Kaç Para Kaç (Hakan Yılmaz)
2014: Kelime Oyunu (Ali İhsan Varol) (Show TV'den geldi.)
2015: Sesi Çok Güzel
2017: Ben Söylerim (Çağla Şikel)
2019-2021: Temizlik Benim İşim (Kadir Ezildi)
2022: Maske Kimsin Sen

References

Fox (Turkey)
Original programming by Turkish television network or channel